Lucky Boy may refer to:
 Lucky Boy (1929 film), an American musical comedy-drama film
 Lucky Boy (2017 film), a comedy and coming-of-age film
 Lucky Boy (novel), a 2017 novel by Shanthi Sekaran
 Lucky Boy, Nevada, a ghost town in Mineral County, Nevada